Poutasi Vaiofiso Tuasivi Luafutu (born 2 December 1987) is a New Zealand born Australian rugby union footballer. He currently plays for Provence Rugby in the Rugby Pro D2. He signed from the Queensland Reds of Super Rugby. He can play anywhere in the backrow.

Biography

Early Years
He started playing rugby league for the Redbank Bears at the age of 10 before switching codes at the age of 12 to play for the Riverview and Districts Junior Rugby Union Club. He was also a keen volleyball and basketball player as a student at Marist College Rosalie.

Super 14
Luafutu made his debut for the Reds in the 2008 Super 14 season against the Bulls. He established himself within the Reds' revival during the 2010 Super 14 season among many other players in the somewhat inexperienced forward pack. He is most noted for his efforts in the Reds' final game of the season against the Highlanders at the Suncorp Stadium, coming off the bench to score 2 tries, the second to win the match with 2 minutes remaining.

Top 14
In signing to Brive, Luafutu discovers the best rugby championship in the world, the Top 14. With Brive, he's named the "Black BOD", or the "New Nonu" because he scored 2 tries in only 2 games and he embodies the future, the evolution of the number 12, the inside centre.

References

1987 births
Australian rugby union players
Queensland Reds players
Living people
Rugby union players from Invercargill